Relative Strangers is a 2006 American comedy film directed by Greg Glienna.

Plot
Thirty-four-year-old psychologist Richard Clayton's (Ron Livingston) parents reveal to him that he was adopted. He then sets out to find out who his biological parents are, but disaster ensues when it turns out that his parents, Frank (Danny DeVito) and Agnes Menure (Kathy Bates), are crude, lower class carnies. They follow him home and cause chaos to his normal life. There are frequent references to the movie Mother, Jugs & Speed used by the characters in the film.

Cast 
 Danny DeVito as Frank Menure
 Kathy Bates as Agnes Menure
 Ron Livingston as Richard Clayton/Menure
 Neve Campbell as Ellen Minnola
 Beverly D'Angelo as Angela Minnola
 Bob Odenkirk as Mitch Clayton
 Edward Herrmann as Doug Clayton
 Christine Baranski as Arleen Clayton
 Martin Mull as Jeffry Morton
 Michael McKean as Ken Hyman
 M. C. Gainey as Spicer
 Star Jones as Holly Davis
 Tracey Walter as Toupee Salesman
Triple H and Dave Batista appear in cameo roles as professional wrestlers
 Paul Tuminaro as Sean Dorgan

References

External links
 
 

2006 films
2000s English-language films
2006 comedy films
American comedy films
Films produced by Ram Bergman
Films produced by Danny DeVito
Films scored by David Kitay
2000s American films